Lee Nichols (or variants) may refer to:

 Lee Nichols (tax commissioner), see List of North Dakota Tax Commissioners
 Leigh Nichols, pen name of Dean Koontz
 Lee Nicholls, footballer

See also
 
 Lee Nicol, victim of Hillsborough Disaster